Andrew G. Barto (born  1948) is an American computer scientist, currently Professor Emeritus of computer science at University of Massachusetts Amherst. Barto is best known for his foundational contributions to the field of modern computational reinforcement learning.

Early life and education 
Barto received his B.S. with distinction in mathematics from the University of Michigan in 1970, after having initially majored in naval architecture and engineering. After reading work by Michael Arbib and McCulloch and Pitts he became interested in using computers and mathematics to model the brain, and five years later was awarded a Ph.D. in computer science for a thesis on cellular automata.

Career 
In 1977, Barto joined the College of Information and Computer Sciences at the University of Massachusetts Amherst as a postdoctoral research associate, was promoted to associate professor in 1982, and full professor in 1991. He was department chair from 2007 to 2011 and a core faculty member of the Neuroscience and Behavior program. 

During this time at UMass, Barto co-directed the Autonomous Learning Laboratory (initially the Adaptive Network Laboratory), which generated several key ideas in reinforcement learning. Richard Sutton, with whom he co-authored the influential book Reinforcement Learning: An Introduction (MIT Press 1988; 2nd edition 2018), was his first PhD student. Barto graduated 27 PhD students, thirteen of which went on to become professors.

Barto published over one hundred papers or chapters in journals, books, and conference and workshop proceedings. He is co-author with Richard Sutton of the book Reinforcement Learning: An Introduction, MIT Press 1998 (2nd edition 2018), and co-editor with Jennie Si, Warren Powell, and Don Wunch II of the Handbook of Learning and Approximate Dynamic Programming, Wiley-IEEE Press, 2004.

Awards and honors 
Barto is a Fellow of the American Association for the Advancement of Science, a Fellow and Senior Member of the IEEE, and a member of the American Association for Artificial Intelligence and the Society for Neuroscience.

Barto was awarded the UMass Neurosciences Lifetime Achievement Award, 2019, the IEEE Neural Network Society Pioneer Award in 2004, and the IJCAI Award for Research Excellence, 2017. His citation for the latter read:Professor Barto is recognized for his groundbreaking and impactful research in both the theory and application of reinforcement learning.

References

External links

Year of birth missing (living people)
1940s births
Living people
University of Michigan alumni
University of Massachusetts Amherst faculty
Fellows of the American Association for the Advancement of Science
Fellow Members of the IEEE
Artificial intelligence researchers
Place of birth missing (living people)